The Tigzirt district is an Algerian administrative district in the Tizi-Ouzou province and the region of Kabylie .  Its chief town is located on the eponymous namesake of Tigzirt.

Communes 
The district is composed of three communes:

 Iflissen ;
 Mizrana ;
 Tigzirt.

References 

Districts of Tizi Ouzou Province